The National Film Finance Corporation (NFFC) was a film funding agency in the United Kingdom in operation from 1949 until 1985. The NFFC was established by the Cinematograph Film Production (Special Loans) Act 1949, and further enhanced by the Cinematograph Film Production (Special Loans) Act 1952, which gave the NFFC the power to borrow from sources other than the Board of Trade. The NFFC was abolished by the Films Act 1985.

The lawyer John Terry (from 1976, Sir John) served as the NFFC's manager for twenty years from 1958 to 1978. During that time, he helped to secure the backing for hundreds of films launching the careers of director Ridley Scott and producer David Puttnam, among many others. The NFFC acted as a lender of last resort for the film industry however, in the early 1970s, the government reduced its funding so it started to operate as a consortium, including with banks, with National Westminster Bank a big investor. This change led to the NFFC using more commercial criteria for funding British films.

John Terry was succeeded in 1979 by film maker Mamoun Hassan who changed the direction of the NFFC: "Hassan is the nearest thing to a whizz-kid that this country's film establishment has yet produced. (Indeed, to be strictly technical, it did not produce him, since Hassan is Saudi Arabian and has had an independent and international career as a film-maker.) Hassan has replied to early salvoes aimed at his policies by firing back at his detractors with more spirit than one has ever known from the NFFC before, in its generation-long history."

Prior to leaving the NFFC, David Robinson of The Times commented: "Certainly Hassan's five and a half years at the Corporation have been characterized by independence and vim. His enthusiasm, pugnacity, taste and passionate championing of an indigenous cinema have made him a significant figure in the progressive areas of British cinema."

Hassan left the NFFC in 1984 to return to film production.

See also
 Eady Levy

References

External links
 Finance legislation from the BFI

1949 establishments in the United Kingdom
1985 disestablishments in the United Kingdom
Organizations established in 1949
Organizations disestablished in 1985
Film organisations in the United Kingdom